Santo Amaro, Portuguese for  "Saint Amaro", may refer to the following places:

Brazil
Santo Amaro, Bahia
Santo Amaro da Imperatriz, Santa Catarina
Santo Amaro das Brotas, Sergipe
Santo Amaro do Maranhão, Maranhão
Santo Amaro, a district in the city of São Paulo
Santo Amaro, a subprefecture in the city of São Paulo
Santo Amaro, São Paulo Metro station
Santo Amaro, a neighborhood in Recife, Brazil

Portugal
Santo Amaro, a civil parish in the municipality of Sousel
, a civil parish in the municipality of Vila Nova de Foz Côa
Santo Amaro, a civil parish in the municipality of São Roque do Pico, Pico, Azores 
Santo Amaro, a civil parish in the municipality of Velas, São Jorge, Azores

São Tomé and Príncipe
Santo Amaro, São Tomé and Príncipe

See also
Amaro (disambiguation)